Elmer Nathan "Al" Corwin (December 3, 1926 – October 23, 2003) was an American professional baseball player, a right-handed pitcher who appeared in Major League Baseball between 1951 and 1955 for the New York Giants. Corwin attended Wallkill Senior High School in Wallkill, Ulster County, New York.

Corwin signed with the Giants in 1948 and 1953 was his only full year in the big leagues. As a Giant, he appeared in 117 games pitched, 22 as a starter. He compiled a won–lost record of 18–10 and an earned run average of 3.98 in 289 innings pitched, allowing 289 hits and 156 bases on balls, with 142 strikeouts and five saves. Corwin made one appearance in the 1951 World Series. In Game 5, in a mop-up relief role, he hurled 1 scoreless innings in a 13–1 victory by the eventual champion New York Yankees.

Corwin retired in 1960 after 13 professional seasons.

References

External links

1926 births
2003 deaths
Baseball players from New York (state)
Charleston Senators players
Dallas Rangers players
Jersey City Giants players
Louisville Colonels (minor league) players
Major League Baseball pitchers
Minneapolis Millers (baseball) players
New York Giants (NL) players
Ottawa Giants players
Reno Silver Sox players
Trenton Giants players
Vancouver Mounties players
Sportspeople from Newburgh, New York